is the name for Japan in French and some other languages. It can also refer to

Geography
 Japons, a town in Austria.

Film
 Japón, a 2002 film by Carlos Reygadas.

Music
 Japón, a song by Calle 13